Mota is a Portuguese and Spanish surname. The name is topographic, originally used for someone who lived near a fortified stronghold. Mota has several versions including Motta (Italian) and Motte (French). Notable people with the surname include:

 Aarón Padilla Mota (born 1977), Mexican footballer
 Adolfo Mota Hernández (born 1976), Mexican politician
 Agostinho José da Mota (1824–1878), Brazilian painter
 Altagracia Ugalde Mota (born 1971), Mexican singer-songwriter
 Ana Celia Mota (born 1935), Argentine-American physicist
 Andy Mota (born 1966), Dominican baseball player
 Antonio Mota (1939–1986), Mexican football goalkeeper
 António Mota (16th century), Portuguese trader and explorer
 António Mota (writer) (born 1957), Portuguese author
 Bernardo Mota (born 1971), Portuguese tennis player
 Bethany Mota (born 1995), American YouTuber
 Bruno da Mota Miranda (born 1995), Brazilian footballer
 Carlos de la Mota (born 1975), Dominican Actor, singer, and architect
 Carlos Mota Pinto (1936–1985), Portuguese professor and politician
 Daniel da Mota (born 1985), Luxembourgish footballer
 Danny Mota (born 1975), Dominican baseball player
 Dany Mota (born 1998), Luxembourgish footballer
 David Mota (born 1985), Spanish rugby player
 Emile Mota (born 1956), Congolese politician
 Erika Mota (born 1995), Dominican volleyball player
 Fabielle Mota (born 1978), Brazilian cyclist
 Feliciano de la Mota Botello (1769–1830), Argentine politician
 Germán Larrea Mota-Velasco (born 1941), Mexican businessman
 Gisela Mota Ocampo (1982–2016), Mexican politician
 Guillermo Mota (born 1973), Dominican baseball player
 Helder Mota Ricardo (born 1977), East Timorese footballer
 Hélder Mota (born 1992), Portuguese footballer
 Javi Mota (born 1984), Spanish singer, actor, dancer, and model
 Jean Mota (born 1993), Brazilian footballer
 João Pedro de Almeida Mota (1744–1817), Portuguese composer
 João Soares da Mota Neto (born 1980), Brazilian footballer
 Joaquim Magalhães Mota (1935–2007), Portuguese lawyer and politician
 José Mota (disambiguation), multiple people
 Josefina Vázquez Mota (born 1961), Mexican businesswoman and politician
 Juan Claudio de la Hoz y Mota (c.1630–c.1710), Spanish dramatist
 Julie Mota (born 1978), Papua New Guinean writer, poet and artist
 Kimberly Altagracia Castillo Mota (born 1988), Dominican model
 Manny Mota (born 1938), Dominican baseball player
 Manuel de Regla Mota (1795–1864), Dominican politician
 Mariana Mota, Uruguayan judge
 Mario de Souza Mota (born 1958), Brazilian footballer
 Miraildes Maciel Mota (born 1978), Brazilian footballer known as Formiga
 Patrícia Mota (born 1982), Dominican actress and film producer
 Paulo Sérgio Mota (born 1991), Portuguese footballer
 Renan Mota (born 1991), Brazilian footballer
 Rosa Mota (born 1958), Portuguese marathon runner
 Salvador Mota (1922–1986), Mexican football goalkeeper
 Sérgio Mota (born 1989), Brazilian footballer
 Telmário Mota (born 1958), Brazilian politician and journalist
 Tiago Mota (disambiguation), multiple people
 Valdemar Mota (1906–1966), Portuguese footballer
 Walquir Mota (born 1967), Brazilian footballer

See also
 Mota (disambiguation)

References

Portuguese-language surnames
Spanish-language surnames